Falmouth Spring is a natural spring on 276 acres of protected lands in Falmouth, Florida. The site is open to the public for swimming and other activities, and is managed by the Suwannee River Water Management District.

See also
List of Florida state parks
Florida state forests
Southwest Florida Water Management District

References

External links
YouTube video of the springs

Bodies of water of Suwannee County, Florida
Springs of Florida
Suwannee River Water Management District reserves
Protected areas of Suwannee County, Florida